Federal Route 125, or Jalan Rasau Kerteh Utara and Jalan Jerangau-Jabor (Penghantar 3), is a federal road in Terengganu, Malaysia.

Features
At most sections, the Federal Route 125 was built under the JKR R5 road standard, allowing maximum speed limit of up to 90 km/h.

List of junctions and towns

References

Malaysian Federal Roads